Caserio or caserío may refer to:
 Hamlet (place), in Spanish-speaking countries
 Caserío vasco or Baserri, a typical Basque farm building
 Marjorie Constance Caserio (born 1929), American chemist
 Mathias Caserio (born 1983), Argentine football player
 Nick Caserio (born 1975), American football executive
 Sante Geronimo Caserio (1873–1894), Italian anarchist and assassin of Marie François Sadi Carnot